Greg Pursley (born January 4, 1968) is an American professional stock car racing driver. The 2011 and 2014 champion of the NASCAR K&N Pro Series West, he drives for Gene Price Motorsports.

Career
Pursley won the NASCAR Weekly Series national championship in 2004. Driving an asphalt Super Late Model for owner Dave Hays, Pursley won 13 of the 18 races that he entered at Irwindale Speedway in California.

Pursely has competed in the NASCAR Camping World Truck Series on a limited basis, but primarily competes in the NASCAR K&N Pro Series West, winning the 2011 championship, and also again in 2014, and scoring 18 wins in the series since his debut in 1999.

Motorsports career results

NASCAR
(key) (Bold – Pole position awarded by qualifying time. Italics – Pole position earned by points standings or practice time. * – Most laps led.)

Busch Series

Camping World Truck Series

K&N Pro Series West

 Season still in progress
 Ineligible for series points

References

External links
 

Living people
1968 births
Sportspeople from Santa Clarita, California
Racing drivers from California
NASCAR drivers
People from Newhall, Santa Clarita, California